Ramesh Puri Maharaj (or Ramesh Baba; born 1960 in Patne, Maharashtra state) is an Indian sant. He was born on Vat Savitri Purnima day (the full moon day in the festival to the goddess Savitri).

Devotion 
Ramesh Puri is a devotee of the divinities Bhagwaan Mahadeva (the god Shiva in his dancing pose); Kartikeya (son of Shiva); Dattatreya (the reincarnation of a trinity of Hindu gods); and Gadhad Nath. He belongs to the Niranjani akhada (monastery) which honours these divinities.

Devotional sites 

The monastery built the Shri Kshetra Rameshwar Shivalay Anand Ashram (roughly, the Holy Pilgrims' Rameshwar Shivalay Anand Retreat) which is devoted to Kartikeya and Dattatreya. The monastery also built the Samadhi temple of Swami Gadhad Nath Maharaj (roughly, the Consciousness temple of the Divine Lord Gadhad our teacher).

Duties 
Ramesh Puri is the Prabhari (caretaker) of the Sarsaiya Ghat under the auspices of the Shivbndhu Services Committee. He also teaches the Mudra Chikitsha.

References

External links 
 Ramesh Puri (in Hindi)
 Mudra Chikitsha YouTube video of Ramesh Puri and Chanchal Mal teaching the proper hand position for recitation of the scripture.

1960 births
Living people
Indian Hindu spiritual teachers